Russel Dalusung Escoto (born December 4, 1992) is a Filipino professional basketball player for the Magnolia Hotshots of the Philippine Basketball Association (PBA).

PBA career statistics

As of the end of 2021 Season

Season-by-season averages
 
|-
| align=left | 
| align=left | Mahindra
| 10 || 18.0 || .468 || .667 || .800 || 4.0 || .1 || .2 || .1 || 8.0
|-
| align=left | 
| align=left | Kia / Columbian
| 26 || 14.4 || .348 || .244 || .529 || 3.0 || .7 || .3 || .2 || 3.9
|-
| align=left rowspan=2| 
| align=left | Columbian
| rowspan=2|36 || rowspan=2|10.7 || rowspan=2|.437 || rowspan=2|.377 || rowspan=2|.677 || rowspan=2|2.3 || rowspan=2|.5 || rowspan=2|.1 || rowspan=2|.1 || rowspan=2|3.9
|-
| align=left | NorthPort
|-
| align=left | 
| align=left | San Miguel
| 13 || 12.2 || .279 || .063 || .417 || 3.2 || .2 || .2 || .7 || 2.3
|-
| align=left | 
| align=left | Magnolia
| 7 || 4.7 || .389 || .200 || 1.000 || .1 || .0 || .0 || .0 || 2.7
|-class=sortbottom
| align=center colspan=2 | Career
| 92 || 12.3 || .393 || .305 || .648 || 2.7 || .4 || .2 || .2 || 4.0

References

1992 births
Living people
Basketball players from Pampanga
Kapampangan people
Terrafirma Dyip players
Philippines men's national basketball team players
Filipino men's basketball players
Power forwards (basketball)
Sportspeople from Angeles City
Filipino Christians
FEU Tamaraws basketball players
NorthPort Batang Pier players
San Miguel Beermen players
Terrafirma Dyip draft picks